Altvater v. Freeman, 319 U.S. 359 (1943), was a decision by the Supreme Court of the United States which held that, although a licensee had maintained payments of royalties, a Declaratory Judgment Act claim of invalidity of the licensed patent still presented a justiciable case or controversy.

See also
List of United States Supreme Court cases, volume 319
MedImmune, Inc. v. Genentech, Inc.,

Further reading

External links
 
 

United States Supreme Court cases
United States Supreme Court cases of the Stone Court
United States patent case law
1943 in United States case law